Cristian Isaac Toro Carballo (born 29 April 1992) is a Spanish canoeist. He competed in the men's K-2 200 metres event at the 2016 Summer Olympics with Saúl Craviotto and won the gold medal.

References

External links
 

1992 births
Living people
Spanish male canoeists
Olympic canoeists of Spain
Olympic gold medalists for Spain
Canoeists at the 2016 Summer Olympics
Medalists at the 2016 Summer Olympics
Olympic medalists in canoeing
People from Nueva Esparta
ICF Canoe Sprint World Championships medalists in kayak
European Games competitors for Spain
Canoeists at the 2015 European Games
Canoeists at the 2019 European Games
21st-century Spanish people